The Celebration (Portuguese: A festa) is a Prêmio Jabuti-winning novel by Brazilian author Ivan Ângelo. Ângelo began writing the book in 1964 but did not publish it until 1976, in part because of the censorship imposed by the Brazilian military regime after the 1964 coup.

It was translated into English by Thomas Colchie in 1982.

Notes

External links
 Reading Ivan Ângelo's The Celebration
  Analysis by Alexandre Inagaki

1976 Brazilian novels